Zhang Zhongqi (born November 2, 1982) is a long-track speed-skater who represented China at the 2010 Winter Olympics in the Men's 500m.

References

Chinese male speed skaters
Olympic speed skaters of China
Speed skaters at the 2006 Winter Olympics
Speed skaters at the 2010 Winter Olympics
1982 births
Living people
Speed skaters at the 2003 Asian Winter Games
Speed skaters at the 2007 Asian Winter Games
Speed skaters at the 2011 Asian Winter Games
Sportspeople from Qiqihar
Universiade silver medalists for China
Universiade medalists in speed skating
Competitors at the 2005 Winter Universiade
21st-century Chinese people